The Fenner–Snyder Mill, also known as Brinker's Mill and the Old Mill, is a historic grist mill located on the McMicheal's creek in the village of Sciota in Hamilton Township, Monroe County, Pennsylvania. The mill was built in 1800, and is a large 2 1/2-story fieldstone and sided banked building. It has a tin roof added about 1860.  It was in continuous milling operation until mid-April 1954.  In 1974, the mill was donated to Hamilton Township with the understanding that it would be used for “historical, cultural, and governmental purposes.”

It was added to the National Register of Historic Places on May 13, 1976.

See also
National Register of Historic Places listings in Monroe County, Pennsylvania

References

Grinding mills on the National Register of Historic Places in Pennsylvania
Industrial buildings completed in 1800
Buildings and structures in Monroe County, Pennsylvania
Grinding mills in Pennsylvania
National Register of Historic Places in Monroe County, Pennsylvania